Berghesia is a monospecific genus of flowering plants in the family Rubiaceae. It was described by Christian Gottfried Daniel Nees von Esenbeck in 1847. The genus contains only one species, viz. Berghesia coccinea, which is endemic to Mexico.

References

External links
Berghesia in the World Checklist of Rubiaceae

Monotypic Rubiaceae genera
Endemic flora of Mexico
Taxa named by Christian Gottfried Daniel Nees von Esenbeck